Honey Acres Airport (FAA LID: 7N4) is a privately-owned, public use airport located one mile (1.6 km) west of Clinton, Michigan on W. Michigan Ave. and spans the border between Lenawee and Washtenaw counties. It is owned and operated by Raymond L. Kussmaul, who also owns the Kussmaul Honey Farm, hence the name of the airport. The airport opened in July 1990.

The airport has hangars for based aircraft, but it does not have any fixed-base operators.

The airport has one runway, designated as 18/36, with a grass surface. It measures 3800 x 90 ft (1158 x 27 m). For the 12-month period ending December 31, 2017, the airport had 456 aircraft operations per year, an average of 38 per month. For the same time period, there are 4 aircraft based on the field, all single-engine airplanes.

References

Airports in Michigan
Airports in Washtenaw County, Michigan
Airports in Lenawee County, Michigan